The 2013 FSCC Early Cash was a bonspiel that was held from September 20 to 22 at the Four Seasons Curling Club in Blaine, Minnesota as part of the 2013–14 World Curling Tour. Both the men's and women's events were being held in a round robin format. The purse for the men's event was $10,000, while the purse for the women's event was $7,000.

Men
The teams are listed as follows:

Teams

Round Robin Standings
Final Round Robin Standings

Playoffs

Women

Teams
The teams are listed as follows:

Round Robin Standings
Final Round Robin Standings

Playoffs

References

External links

2013 in curling
Curling in Minnesota